Leucochlaena is a genus of moths of the family Noctuidae.

Species
 Leucochlaena aenigma Pinhey, 1968
 Leucochlaena fallax (Staudinger, 1870)
 Leucochlaena hirsuta (Staudinger, 1891)
 Leucochlaena hoerhammeri (Wagner, 1931)
 Leucochlaena leucocera (Hampson, 1894)
 Leucochlaena muscosa (Staudinger, 1891)
 Leucochlaena oditis (Hübner, [1822])
 Leucochlaena seposita Turati, 1919
 Leucochlaena turatii (Schawerda, 1931)

References
Natural History Museum Lepidoptera genus database
Leucochlaena at funet

Cuculliinae